Konstantinos Gkiouvetsis (born 19 November 1999) is a Greek water polo player. He competed in the 2020 Summer Olympics.

References

1999 births
Living people
Water polo players at the 2020 Summer Olympics
Greek male water polo players
Olympic water polo players of Greece
Medalists at the 2020 Summer Olympics
Olympic silver medalists for Greece
Olympic medalists in water polo